An amphibious command ship (LCC) of the United States Navy is a large, special-purpose ship, originally designed to command large amphibious invasions. However, as amphibious invasions have become unlikely, they are now used as general command ships, and serve as floating headquarters for the various combatant commands.  Currently, they are assigned to the 6th and 7th Fleets as flagships.

Active ships 
USS Blue Ridge (LCC-19)
USS Mount Whitney (LCC-20)

Previous ships 
 was the lead ship of the previous class of amphibious force command ships. She was designed as an amphibious force flagship, a floating command post with advanced communications equipment and extensive combat information spaces to be used by the amphibious forces commander and landing force commander during large-scale operations.

World War II 
In World War II this type of ship was termed Amphibious Force Flagship (AGC).
It was not a specific ship class, but rather one that had appropriate radio capabilities and space for command operations. Typically a merchant ship under construction would be completed as an Amphibious Force Flagship, but some ships were refitted for this purpose. 
, former AP-66
, former WPG-33
, former AVP-11
, former WPG-37
The original meaning of AGC was based on the General Auxiliary class of miscellaneous unclassified vessels AG and sub-class C, with 3 possible meanings; Command, Control, or Communications, but it became an anacronym, since all AGCs were called Amphibious Force Flagships.
The British used the term Landing Ship Infantry (Headquarters) for this type of ship.

See also 
List of US Navy Amphibious Force Flagships (AGC)
List of US Navy Amphibious Command Ships (LCC)

References

External links
U.S. Navy Factfile
LCC 19 Blue Ridge class at GlobalSecurity.org
p177 AGC ships of the U.S. fleet
p261 U.S. amphibious ships and craft: Command and Control

Ship types
Naval ships of the United States